Lady Willingdon Hospital is located in Lahore, Punjab, Pakistan. It is a teaching hospital of King Edward Medical College. It is one of the largest maternity hospital in Pakistan. Its history dates back to 1930 when Teka Devi Health Centre was opened as an outpatient clinic for women on the Fort Road, Lahore.

It has been a teaching institution since 1933, attracting under-graduate, post-graduate and post-fellowship doctors. It is fully recognised for training by the HEC, PMDC, CPSP and the RCOG (UK).

History
In 1933, Lt. Col. S. N. Hayes, laid the foundation stone of Lady Willingdon Hospital, naming it after the wife of the 22nd Viceroy of India. He became the hospital's first Medical Superintendent and was also one of the former Principals of King Edward Medical College).  The hospital was affiliated with King Edward Medical College, Lahore that same year.

Relocation 
In 2011, the Punjab government faced resistance by local residents, after introducing a plan for the relocation of the Lady Willingdon Hospital and The de'Montmorency College of Dentistry. Allegedly, the drive has been initiated to clear the view of the Badshashi Mosque and the Minar-e-Pakistan. According to locals, it would be unwise to relocate the hospital, given the fact that the institution is catering to thousands of people living in this densely populated area. Despite the opposition from locals and the doctors' community, in 2014 a chunk of 44 kanal land was identified behind Lorry Adda (Badamai Bagh) for constructing a new building of the Lady Willingdon Hospital.

References

Hospital buildings completed in 1933
Hospitals in Lahore
Teaching hospitals in Pakistan
Hospitals established in 1930
King Edward Medical University
1933 establishments in British India